The Rock'n Solex festival is a French student festival, combining Solex racing and music, first held in 1967.

It combines Solex races during the day and music concerts every night.

External links
 Official Site (in French)
 List of the previous programmes  (in French)

Festivals in France